Cheonma or Chonma may refer to:

 Cheonma, or Chonma (天馬), a winged-horse, and traditional pattern of Korea

Places
 Chonma County (天摩郡), North Pyeongan, North Korea
 Cheonma Reeducation Camp, a prison in North Korea
 Cheonmachong (Cheonma Tomb, 天馬塚), Gyeongju, South Korea
 Cheonmasan (Mt. Cheonma, 天摩山), Namyangju. Gyeonggi-do, South Korea
 Cheonmasan station
 Mt. Chŏnma (Chonma-san), Kaesong, North Hwanghae Province, North Korea

Military
 Chonma-ho (天馬號; Chonma Tank), a North Korean main battle tank
 Cheonma (missile) (K-SAM Pegasus), a South Korean surface-to-air missile name for the Korean winged-horse cheonma (천마/天馬)
 7th Airborne Special Forces Brigade "Pegasus", South Korean Army; see List of paratrooper forces

Other uses
 Cheonma, a short story by Kim Sa-ryang

See also

 Tianma (天馬; Heavenly Horse)